Cadmogenes is a genus of moths of the  family Plutellidae. It contains only one species, Cadmogenes literata, which is found in New Zealand. This species is endemic to New Zealand. It has been classified as "Not Threatened" by the Department of Conservation.

Taxonomy

The genus Cadmogenes was described in the family Plutellidae, but is considered an enigmatic unplaced genus (along with the genus Titanomis) and may require its own family.

Cadmogenes literata was first described by Edward Meyrick in 1923 using specimens collected at Silverstream and Auckland in January. George Hudson described and illustrated this species in his 1928 book The Butterflies and Moths of New Zealand. The lectotype specimen was collected at Kauri Gully, Birkenhead, Auckland by George Hudson and is held at the Natural History Museum, London.

Description 

Meyrick described the species as follows:
The wing venation of the adult moth differs depending on whether the larvae is reared from Weinmannia  or Caldcluvia inflorescences.

Distribution 
This species is endemic to New Zealand. C. literata occurs in the Northland, Auckland, Taupo, Taranaki and Wellington areas.

Host species and biology 
The larvae feed on the flowers of Caldcluvia and Weinmannia species. There is one generation per year. The type locality of Kauri Gully now has few Weinmannia trees but these are abundant at Silverstream.

Conservation status 
This species has been classified as having the "Not Threatened" conservation status under the New Zealand Threat Classification System.

References

Moths described in 1923
Plutellidae
Moths of New Zealand
Endemic fauna of New Zealand
Taxa named by Edward Meyrick
Endemic moths of New Zealand